The Sex Education Show was a British sex education television show. It was presented by Anna Richardson and Dr. Radha Modgil and was broadcast on Channel 4. It was designed to speak frankly about sex to teenagers, answering any questions they had about sexual intercourse, puberty, relationships, body image, etc.

Series 1
The first series was titled The Sex Education Show. It includes six episodes and was broadcast in September–October 2008.

Series 2
The second series was titled The Sex Education Show vs Pornography. It includes four episodes and was broadcast between 30 March and 2 April 2009.

Series 3
The third series was titled The Sex Education Show: Am I Normal?. It includes four episodes and was broadcast 5–8 July 2010.

Series 4
The fourth series was titled The Sex Education Show: Stop Pimping Our Kids. It includes four episodes and was broadcast 19 April 2011, the last episode was shown on 6 December 2011.

This series campaign included the setting up of a Facebook page and a petition. The Facebook page took some criticism for condemning what many believed were perfectly normal children's clothes, and eventually a breakaway satirical Facebook page 'Stop Stop Pimping Our Kids' was set up.

Series 5
The fifth series was titled The Sex Education Show. It includes six episodes and was broadcast between 19 July and 23 August 2011.

References

External links
 
 

2010s British television series
2008 British television series debuts
Channel 4 original programming
Sex education television series
Sex education in the United Kingdom